Tmesisternus andaii is a species of beetle in the family Cerambycidae. It was described by E. Forrest Gilmour in 1952. It is known from Papua New Guinea.

References

andaii
Beetles described in 1952